The 1921 All England Championships was a badminton tournament held at the Royal Horticultural Hall, Westminster, England from 2 March to 6 March 1921.

Sir George Thomas successfully defended the men's singles title and he partnered Hazel Hogarth in also defending their mixed doubles crown. Kitty McKane made it three defending champions retaining their titles after winning the women's singles. McKane also partnered her older sister Margaret McKane when winning the women's doubles. The final championship event the men's doubles saw Thomas claim a third title at the 1921 Championships, with Frank Hodge.

Final results

Men's singles

Women's singles

Men's doubles

Women's doubles

Mixed doubles

References

All England Open Badminton Championships
All England
All England Open Badminton Championships in London
All England Championships
All England Badminton Championships
All England Badminton Championships